Radio communication service or radiocommunication service is according to Article 1.19 of the International Telecommunication Union's Radio Regulations (ITU RR), defined as “a service…involving the transmission, emission and/or reception of radio waves for specific telecommunication purposes”.

Radiocommunication is sub-divided into space and terrestrial radiocommunication. Space radiocommunication is defined in RR Article 1 as “any radiocommunication involving the use of one or more space stations or the use of one or more reflecting satellites or other objects in space”. Terrestrial radiocommunication is defined as “any radiocommunication other than space radiocommunication or radio astronomy”.

Types
Section III of Article 1 of the ITU Radio Regulations sets out the definitions of some 40 radio services including such services as the fixed service, the mobile service, the land mobile service, the broadcasting service, the standard frequency and time signal service as well as the definition of radio astronomy which is defined as “a service involving the use of radio astronomy”. Note that the radio astronomy service is not a radiocommunication service but simply a service involving the use of radio astronomy.

Sub-sets of services and branches
Some services are a sub-set of another service. For example, the land mobile service can be thought of as a branch of the mobile service which encompasses the land, maritime and aeronautical mobile services. For many terrestrial radiocommunication communication services, there is a parallel space radiocommunication service e.g., the broadcasting service and the broadcasting-satellite service.

Further sub-sets of some of these internationally defined services are often created at the national level. For example, within the land mobile service, a country may choose to define such services as paging, dispatch two-way radio service, cellular mobile telephone service, trunked mobile radio service, etc. Many of these definitions are based upon the nature of the service being provided rather than the international concept of a radiocommunication service. In other words, the term “service” can be used in these two different ways. No matter what definitions are adopted in a given country, with some specific exceptions which are allowed for in the ITU RRs, the use of the spectrum must fit in with the international definitions of radio services.

References